Akchernsky is a rural locality (a khutor) in Akchernskoye Rural Settlement, Uryupinsky District, Volgograd Oblast, Russia. The population was 228 as of 2010. There are 2 streets.

Geography 
Akchernsky is located in steppe, 22 km south of Uryupinsk (the district's administrative centre) by road. Dyakonovsky 1-y is the nearest rural locality.

References 

Rural localities in Uryupinsky District